Sikongo District is a district of Zambia, located in Western Province. It was separated from Kalabo District in 2012.

References

Districts of Western Province, Zambia